Flo & Eddie is the second album from Flo & Eddie. After being out of print since the 1970s, it was released on CD for the first time in 2008 in a package that includes their first album, The Phlorescent Leech & Eddie (1972).

The album was produced by Bob Ezrin, who was the producer for Alice Cooper.[] The album was made to accompany the Alice Cooper Billion Dollar Babies world tour in 1973-74, for which Flo & Eddie were the opening act.

Track listing

Side one 
"If We Only Had the Time"  (Kaylan, Volman, John Seiter)
"Days" (Ray Davies)
"You're a Lady" (Peter Sarstedt)
"Carlos and the Bull" (Kaylan, Volman, Barnaby Conrad)
"Afterglow" (Steve Marriott, Ronnie Lane)

Side two 
"Best Part of Breaking Up" (Phil Spector, Vince Poncia, Peter Andreoli)
"The Sanzini Brothers" (Volman, Kaylan, Ian Underwood)
"Another Pop Star's Life" (Volman, Kaylan)
"Just Another Town" (Kaylan, Volman)
"Marmendy Mill" (Kaylan, Volman, Bob Ezrin, Dick Wagner)

Personnel 
 Howard Kaylan - vocals
 Mark Volman - vocals, guitar
 Gary Rowles - lead guitar
 John Herron - keyboards
 Jim Pons - bass
 Aynsley Dunbar - drums

Additional personnel 
 Bob Ezrin - piano
 John Sebastian - vocals
 Steve Hunter - guitar
 Dick Wagner - guitar
 Steve Madaio - trumpet
 Allan MacMillan - orchestra arrangements
 Produced by Bob Ezrin
 Engineered by Jack Douglas - Shelly Yakus
 Executive producer - Larry Heller
 Recorded at Sunset Sound, Paramount in Los Angeles and The Record Plant in New York City
George Whiteman - photography
Pacific Eye & Ear - design

References 

1974 albums
Flo & Eddie albums
Albums produced by Bob Ezrin
Albums recorded at Record Plant (New York City)
Reprise Records albums